The Future's What It Used to Be is the fifth studio album by the British electronic band Apollo 440. It was released in January 2012 by Radikal Records.

Track listing

Personnel
Apollo 440
Ewan MacFarlane - lead vocals
Howard Gray
Noko
Trevor Gray
Cliff Hewitt - acoustic drums

See also
Sadly, the Future Is No Longer What It Was

2012 albums
Apollo 440 albums